Aleksei Anatolyevich Yushchuk (born 10 February 1987) is a Russian former professional football player.

Club career
He made his Russian Football National League debut for FC Zvezda Irkutsk on 5 September 2008 in a game against FC Torpedo Moscow.

External links
 
 

1987 births
Sportspeople from Irkutsk
Living people
Russian footballers
FC Zvezda Irkutsk players
Association football midfielders
FC Baikal Irkutsk players